The Amiral Orhan Aydın Sports Hall is an indoor arena located in Marmaris town of Muğla Province, Turkey. Owned by the Marmaris Municipality, it was opened March 1999. The venue, which is suitable for use of basketball and volleyball competitions, has a seating capacity of 1,040. The venue was renamed in honor of Rear admiral Orhan Aydın, Commander of 
the Turkish Naval Academy, who died as a result of the 1999 İzmit earthquake at the Turkish Navy headquarters in Gölcük on August 17.

The facility consists of also six tennis courts, a bowling alley, a squash tennis court, a futsal pitch, a fitness center as well as sauna and whirlpool tub for recreation, which are in service since May 2001.

Major events
On July 13–14, the venue hosted the final four events of 2013 Men's European Volleyball League.

References

Indoor arenas in Turkey
Sports venues completed in 1999
Basketball venues in Turkey
Volleyball venues in Turkey
Buildings and structures in Muğla Province
Tourist attractions in Muğla Province
Sport in Marmaris
1999 establishments in Turkey